Sharif Bogere (born October 8, 1988) is a Ugandan professional boxer in the Lightweight division. He is a one-time WBO NABO Lightweight Champion and was named the 2010 Outstanding Young Male Boxer of the Year. Bogere is currently signed to Mayweather Promotions. Bogere is known for his flamboyant ring entrances and aggressive fighting style. He is currently trained by legendary trainer Kenny Adams.

Early life
Sharif grew up living the first 18 years of his life in Kampala, the capital city of Uganda.

Bogere began fighting - unwillingly - when he was 7 years old, fending off thieves and bullies. Bogere beat everyone. Eventually, he made his way into a legitimate gym, where the older veteran boxers took notice of the kid whose shadowboxing looked so fluid and natural. He started spending all of his time at the gym, sometimes practicing for hours without hand wraps or spare change for a drink of water.

This tough upbringing has translated Bogere into maintaining a strong work ethic in and out of the ring as well as a very humble personality.

Amateur career
Sharif was a five-time African Champion and the captain of the Ugandan national boxing team

Bogere finished his amateur career with an astounding record of 68 wins with just 4 losses (68-4-0).

Professional career

Fighting style
Sharif is an orthodox boxer who has gotten praise from the boxing legend Mike Tyson. "I have watched him four times in Vegas and he seems to possess the potential to go far," Tyson said to BoxingScene. "He’s got speed and agility with some pomp. He is very agile."

Trademark
Sharif is known as "The Lion" and the "Lion Warrior". He is carried to the ring in a cage while wearing a legitimate lions head and skin. The lion head and skin he wears came from a lion that was killed in Africa after it had mauled several people. The reasoning behind this spectacular entrance is that Bogere wanted to do something memorable that would excite the fans as well as pay tribute to his native Ugandan fans where his legacy is becoming cemented as a national hero.

Lightweight
On September 18, 2010 Bogere stopped Mexico's Julian Rodriguez at 1:43 of the second round on the undercard of Shane Mosley vs. Sergio Mora by knockout in round 2, on HBO PPV. He dropped Rodriguez, who was unsteady when he got to his feet and referee called it off.

On May 21, 2010, Bogere continued to make a name for himself when he defeated veteran Ilido Julio handily. Bogere nearly drilled Julio out of the ring in the closing seconds of the first round. Julio refused to come out for the start of the sixth round, remaining on his stool and signaling an end to the onslaught.

Bogere vs. Beltran
On May 13, 2011 Bogere defeated Raymundo Beltran in a bloody, headbutt-filled 10 Round main event, for the vacant WBO NABO lightweight title. He had a clear speed advantage against Beltran. Beltran constantly stalked Bogere, walking through his punches and looking to engage him in close quarters. This worked for Beltran at times, but Bogere came through the fight to win the WBO NABO lightweight title by unanimous decision.

On October 7, 2011 Bogere defended his WBO NABO lightweight title by fighting Francisco Contreras. Contreras was also undefeated in 16 fights with 13 by way of KO. Bogere was constantly in control and by the 3rd round stopped Contreras with a knockout blow to the back of the head. Although controversial, referee Jay Nady deemed it to be legitimate and Bogere retained the WBO NABO lightweight title.

Bogere vs. Abril
After two back-to-back victories against Mexico's Sergio Rivera and Manuel Leyva, Bogere would fight Richar Abril for the unified WBA Lightweight Title on March 2, 2013. The fight was originally scheduled for November 24 on the HBO undercard of Robert Guerrero vs. Andre Berto, however Bogere suffered a partial tear of his left Achilles tendon during training and the fight was postponed.

Bogere came out very aggressive and this fight was labeled as a "rough and tumble affair". Bogere was able to get inside and win many of the early rounds. As the later rounds began, Abril began holding Bogere as a tactic and was able to counter punch to win the later rounds. Abril handed Bogere his first professional defeat. After the fight, it was revealed that Bogere had re-injured his Achilles during a middle round, which severely affected his ability to pull out a victory. Floyd Mayweather Sr., who was in attendance disagreed with the decision, saying afterwards that "Bogere won nine rounds, Abril won three".

Had Bogere won the fight, he would have faced off against the highly touted Adrien Broner, which would have had both the WBC and WBA lightweight championships on the line. Before the injury, Bogere was ranked the number 3 lightweight in the world by the WBO.

Return from injury

On April 26, 2014, Bogere returned from successful Achilles tendinitis surgery on the Keith Thurman-Julio Diaz undercard. He won his first fight back in action against Arturo Urena, via TKO when Urena's trainer threw in the towel during the sixth round. Just two months later, on June 21, 2014, Bogere would earn another quick victory stopping Miguel Zamudio in the third round on the Robert Guerrero-Yoshihiro Kamegai undercard. Following the victory, Bogere was then again ranked as a top 10 lightweight by The Ring Magazine and ESPN.

On October 30, 2014, Bogere returned to national television with his third straight decisive victory. Live on Fox Sports 1, Bogere knocked out Fernando Garcia in the 5th round with a straight right. Bogere landed an impressive 195 punches out of 498 thrown (39%) in just the five round bout. Garcia landed only 39 out of his 157 thrown (25%). Following this performance, announcers Brian Custer and Paulie Malignaggi agreed that Bogere's speed, sharp offensive combinations and his consistency had put his name into the title shot conversation for a lightweight championship. Bogere sparred with WBO Light Welterweight Champion Chris Algieri out of the Long Life Fighter Gym in Las Vegas in preparation for this fight.

Pursuit of World title

In an interview with Fight-Hype, Bogere exclaimed, "There are some tough guys in my division, but I'm not afraid of any of them. I'm a warrior and a lion and I can take care of any of these guys on any given night."

In an interview with Kawowo Sports, Bogere explained, "I am adamant that I was the better fighter against Abril and he can't ask for a rematch because he knows I will beat him. I have become a much better fighter and I now have been trained to land punches that will finish off my opponent."

At the 2015 WBC Convention, his promoter Oscar De La Hoya stated, "The Lion is going to eat someone up in 2015 and it's going to be a big year for Sharif. It's going to be Lion time."

In a documentary piece shown by The Africa Channel, Shane Mosley praised Bogere, stating that "I noticed right off when I watched him working that he's very strong - physically strong. Not only that, but mentally strong. When he gets in there he's very determined, regardless of whether he takes a couple shots or not, he's coming right back. He is one of the best fighters out there. He needs a chance at a title, in my opinion."

In September 2015, the Transnational Boxing Rankings Board and The Ring Magazine have Bogere ranked as high as 3rd in the world in the lightweight division.

Professional record 

| style="text-align:center;" colspan="8"|32 Wins (20 knockouts, 12 decisions),  2 Loss, 0 Draws, 1 No Contest
|-  style="text-align:center; background:#e3e3e3;"
|-  style="text-align:center; background:#e3e3e3;"
|  style="border-style:none none solid solid; "|Result
|  style="border-style:none none solid solid; "|Record
|  style="border-style:none none solid solid; "|Opponent
|  style="border-style:none none solid solid; "|Date
|  style="border-style:none none solid solid; "|Result
|  style="border-style:none none solid solid; "|Time
|  style="border-style:none none solid solid; "|Location
|  style="border-style:none none solid solid; "|Notes
|- align=center
|Win
|align='center'|31–1–1
|align=left| Arturo Santos Reyes
|
|align='left'|UD 10
|align='left'|3:00
|align=left|   
|
|-align=left
|Win
|align='center'|30–1–1
|align=left| Jose Luis Rodriguez
|
|align='left'|UD 10
|align='left'|3:00
|align=left|   
|
|-align=left
|Win
|align='center'|29–1–1
|align=left| Luis Eduardo Florez
|
|align='left'|TKO 5
|align='left'|2:05
|align=left|   
|
|-align=left
|Win
|align='center'|28–1–1
|align=left| Samuel Amoako
|
|align='left'|UD 10
|align='left'|3:00
|align=left|   
|
|-align=left
|style="background:#ddd;"|
|align='center'|27–1
|align=left| Jose Daniel Ruiz
|
|
|
|align=left|   
|
|- align=left
|Win
|align='center'|27–1
|align=left| Joksan Hernandez
|
|align='left'|KO 2
|
|align=left|   
|
|-align=left
|Win
|align='center'|26–1
|  Fernando Garcia
|
|align='left'|KO 5
|align='left'|2:30
| 
|
|-align=left
|Win
|align='center'|25–1
| Miguel Zamudio
|
|align='left'|RTD 3
|align='left'|3:00
| 
|
|-align=left
|Win
|align='center'|24–1
| Arturo Urena
|
|align='left'|TKO 6
|align='left'|0:50
| 
|align='left'|
|-align=left
|Loss
|align='center'|23–1
| Richar Abril
|
|align='left'|UD 12
|align='left'|3:00
| 
|align='left'|
|-align=left
|Win
|align='center'|23–0
| Manuel Leyva
|
|align='left'|KO 2
|align='left'|0:38
| 
|
|-align=left
|Win
|align='center'|22–0
| Sergio Rivera
|
|align='left'|TKO 3
|align='left'|3:00
| 
|align=left|
|-align=left
|Win
|align='center'|21–0
| Francisco Contreras
|
|align='left'|KO 3
|align='left'|2:01
| 
|align=left|
|-align=left
|Win
|align='center'|20–0
| Raymundo Beltran
|
|align='left'|UD 10
|align='left'|3:00
| 
|align=left|
|-align=left
|Win
|align='center'|19–0
| Shamir Reyes
|
|align='left'|KO 1
|align='left'|2:37
| 
|
|-align=left
|Win
|align='center'|18–0
| Christopher Fernandez
|
|align='left'|UD 8
|align='left'|3:00
| 
|align='left'|
|-align=left
|Win
|align='center'|17–0
| Julian Rodriguez
|
|align='left'|KO 2
|align='left'|1:43
| 
|align='left'|
|
|-align=left
|Win
|align='center'|16–0
| Ilido Julio
|
|align='left'|RTD 5
|align='left'|0:10
| 
|
|-
|-align=left
|Win
|align='center'|15–0
| Martin Tucker
|
|align='left'|RTD 1
|align='left'|3:00
| 
|
|-
|-align=left
|Win
|align='center'|14–0
| Jose Hernandez
|
|align='left'|TKO 3
|align='left'|0:44
| 
|
|-
|-align=left
|Win
|align='center'|13–0
| Cristian Favela
|
|align='left'|UD 6
|align='left'|3:00
| 
|
|-
|-align=left
|Win
|align='center'|12–0
| Rodolfo Armenta
|
|align='left'|TKO 2
|align='left'|1:07
| 
|
|-
|-align=left
|Win
|align='center'|11–0
| Mike Gonzalez
|
|align='left'|UD 6
|align='left'|3:00
| 
|
|-
|-align=left
|Win
|align='center'|10–0
| Broderick Antoine
|
|align='left'|UD 6
|align='left'|3:00
| 
|
|-
|-align=left
|Win
|align='center'|9–0
| Kevin Carmody
|
|align='left'|TKO 2
|align='left'|0:40
| 
|
|-
|-align=left
|Win
|align='center'|8–0
| Marcos Herrera
|
|align='left'|TKO 2
|align='left'|2:43
| 
|
|-
|-align=left
|Win
|align='center'|7–0
| Courtney Landis
|
|align='left'|KO 1
|align='left'|2:33
| 
|
|-
|-align=left
|Win
|align='center'|6–0
| Carlos Small
|
|align='left'|UD 4
|align='left'|3:00
| 
|
|-
|-align=left
|Win
|align='center'|5–0
| Manny Cotrich
|
|align='left'|TKO 2
|align='left'|0:42
| 
|
|-
|-align=left
|Win
|align='center'|4–0
| Mike Peralta
|
|align='left'|UD 4
|align='left'|3:00
| 
|
|-
|-align=left
|Win
|align='center'|3–0
| Alejandro Lopez
|
|align='left'|UD 4
|align='left'|3:00
| 
|
|-
|-align=left
|Win
|align='center'|2–0
| Reymundo Hernandez
|
|align='left'|TKO 1
|align='left'|0:41
| 
|
|-
|-align=left
|Win
|align='center'|1–0
| Ed Lee Humes
|
|align='left'|KO 1
|align='left'|1:09
| 
|align=left|

Titles in boxing

Minor world title:
 WBO NABO Lightweight World Champion (135 lbs) - 5/13/2011 to 3/2/2013 (660 days)

In other media
In a 2009 episode of Sports Soup, Versus showed a clip of Bogere clipping opponent Rodolfo Armenta with a flurry of punches, causing him to lose his footing. Host Matt Iseman joked that that was the "first time he'd seen a guy get hit so hard, he contracted polio."

Entrance themes
 "Talk Is Cheap" by Blaq Fuego (March 2, 2013 – present) 
 "Stronger" by Nubia (August 7, 2009 - July 2, 2012) 
 "Warrior Lion" by Blaq Fuego (April 5, 2008 – July 17, 2009)

References

External links

 Sharif Bogere's profile at Golden Boy Promotions

 Official 
 Official 

1988 births
Living people
Lightweight boxers
Ugandan male boxers
Boxers at the 2006 Commonwealth Games
Commonwealth Games competitors for Uganda
Sportspeople from Kampala